Attorney General Murphy may refer to:

Edward Sullivan Murphy (1880–1945), Attorney General for Northern Ireland
Frank Murphy (1890–1949), United States Attorney General
George W. Murphy (1841–1920), Attorney General of Arkansas
John W. Murphy (Arizona politician) (1874–1947), Attorney General of Arizona
Lionel Murphy (1922–1986), Attorney-General of Australia
Maurice J. Murphy Jr. (1927–2002), New Hampshire Attorney General
Mike Murphy (New Brunswick politician) (born 1958), Attorney General of New Brunswick
Robert C. Murphy (judge) (1926–2000), Attorney General of Maryland

See also
Alonzo Morphy (1798–1856), Attorney General of Louisiana
General Murphy (disambiguation)